The Cromarty dialect of North Northern Scots was spoken in Cromarty, Scotland. The dialect originated from people who moved north from the Firth of Forth in the 15th and 16th centuries. The last native speaker of the dialect, Bobby Hogg, died in 2012 at age 92.

The dialect had a heavy influence from both Highland English and Scottish Gaelic. The dialect was recorded so that if it was to die out it could still be read and studied.

References

Scots dialects
Black Isle
Languages attested from the 15th century
Languages extinct in the 2010s
Extinct languages of Scotland
2012 disestablishments in Scotland